The flying mice, also known as the pygmy scaly-tails, pygmy scaly-tailed flying squirrels, or pygmy anomalures are not true mice, not true squirrels, and are not capable of true flight.  These unusual rodents are essentially miniaturized versions of anomalures and are part of the same sub-Saharan African radiation of gliding mammal.

Characteristics 
These animals resemble mice with gliding membranes and long, sparsely-haired tails.  Their appearance is similar to some marsupial gliders.  They are less than 10 cm (4 inches) in head and body length and weigh 14-35 grams (1/2 - 1.2 oz).

Flying mice are nocturnal and are found in the poorly explored tropical forests of central (and to a lesser extent western) Africa.  Little is known of their habits as a result.  It has been suggested that one or both species may live in colonies of dozens of individuals.  Bats may also be found sharing these tree-hollow colonies.

Species
Long-eared flying mouse (Idiurus macrotis)
Pygmy scaly-tailed flying squirrel (Idiurus zenkeri)

See also
 Gliding mammal

References
Dieterlen, F. 2005. Family Anomaluridae. pp. 1532–1534 in Mammal Species of the World a Taxonomic and Geographic Reference. D. E. Wilson and D. M. Reeder eds. Johns Hopkins University Press, Baltimore.
Kingdon, J. 1997. The Kingdon Field Guide to African Mammals. Academic Press Limited, London.
Nowak, Ronald M. 1999. Walker's Mammals of the World, 6th edition. Johns Hopkins University Press, 1936 pp. 
Durrell, Gerald 1974. "The Bafut Beagles", 4th impression. Hart-Davis, MacGibbon pp 204–254( )

 
Anomalures